Renny Piers Smith (born 3 October 1996) is an English-born Austrian professional footballer who plays as a midfielder. He has also represented Austria internationally at under-18 and under-19 level.

Career
Smith was born in Epsom, Surrey, and attended the Whitgift School in South Croydon. He started his career in the youth team at Chelsea where he stayed until early 2013, before he made the decision to leave following a difference in opinion over his playing position. He subsequently joined London rivals Arsenal on a two-year scholarship, a move which followed him being on trial at clubs Liverpool and Manchester City. He featured regularly for Arsenal's youth team over various competitions including the UEFA Youth League, but he failed to make the breakthrough to the first team. He failed to earn a professional deal and was released in the summer of 2015 following the end of his scholarship.

In August 2015, he signed for Championship side Burnley on a three-year contract, following a successful trial against Sheffield. He was placed immediately into the Development Squad. In February 2016 he joined Swedish Superettan side GAIS on a season-long loan, following a successful two-week trial. During his time with the club he made ten league appearances, however, he was predominantly used as a substitute or remained on the bench.

In August 2016, he was recalled early from his loan with GAIS and was sold to Italian Serie B side Vicenza for a nominal fee. He made his professional debut for the side in November 2016, replacing Francesco Signori as a substitute in the 1–0 league win over Trapani Calcio. On 31 January 2017, Smith joined Lega Pro side Mantova on loan.

On 5 July 2018, Smith joined Dutch side Dordrecht on a three-year deal.

On 15 September 2020, Smith joined Austrian Bundesliga side WSG Tirol on a free transfer.

International career
Despite being born in England, Smith qualifies to represent Austria through his maternal grandfather. His father, Renny Sr., alerted the Austrian Football Association of his eligibility, and in April 2014 he received his first call-up to the under-18 side for a friendly against Denmark, after the Association had scouted him in Arsenal youth team fixtures. He made his debut in the 2–1 win.

Career statistics

Club
.

References

External links
Profile at UEFA

1996 births
Living people
Association football midfielders
Sportspeople from Epsom
English footballers
Austrian people of English descent
Burnley F.C. players
GAIS players
L.R. Vicenza players
Mantova 1911 players
F.C. Südtirol players
FC Dordrecht players
WSG Tirol players
Superettan players
Serie B players
Serie C players
Eerste Divisie players
Austria youth international footballers
Austrian footballers
People educated at Whitgift School
Expatriate footballers in Italy
Expatriate footballers in Sweden
English expatriate footballers
English expatriate sportspeople in the Netherlands